Ted Forssberg (10 December 1895 – 23 May 1953) was an Australian cricketer. He played eight first-class matches for New South Wales between 1920/21 and 1921/22.

See also
 List of New South Wales representative cricketers

References

External links
 

1895 births
1953 deaths
Australian cricketers
New South Wales cricketers
Cricketers from Sydney